Mayang Sari Beach Resort is a hotel and resort on the northwestern coast of Bintan, Indonesia, approximately 50 minutes by high-speed ferry from Singapore. It is noted for its traditional Riau Islands beach chalets along the beach. The resort has 50 chalets, organized in blocks of 4. The hotel's restaurant and bar overlooks the beach.

References

External links
Mayang Sari Beach Resort Bintan

Hotels in Bintan Island
Resorts in Indonesia
Hotels established in 1994
Hotel buildings completed in 1994